The Kapitalna coal mine (before 2017 - Stakhanov coal mine) is a large coal mine in the south-east of Ukraine in Donetsk Oblast. Kapitalna is one of the largest coal reserves in Ukraine, having estimated reserves of 139.7 million tonnes. The annual coal production is around 1.85 million tonnes. The mine was built according to the project of Dondiproshakht (chief engineer of the project - A.V. Cherenkov), which was completed in 1964 and approved by the Supreme Council of National Economy of the USSR Council of Ministers of the USSR by Order No. 114-R of August 2, 1965. 

A roof collapse in the Stakhanov mine on August 18, 2011, killed two miners.

According to the latest amendments made by Dongiproshakht to the mine development project "Opening and preparation of the inclined minefield, preparation of the inclined field of the l3 (l1) block No. 4, construction of block No. 5",  the design capacity of the mine was set at 2400 thousand tons per year.  In 2014, however, the actual production capacity was only 1 million tons per year.

See also 

 Coal in Ukraine
 List of mines in Ukraine

References 

Coal mines in Ukraine
Economy of Donetsk Oblast
Myrnohrad